A fatwa by Ayatollah Ali Khamenei, the Supreme Leader of Iran, against the acquisition, development and use of nuclear weapons dates back to the mid-1990s. The first public announcement is reported to have occurred in October 2003, followed by an official statement at a meeting of the International Atomic Energy Agency (IAEA) in Vienna in August 2005.

Some analysts have questioned either the existence, applicability and/or constancy of the fatwa. According to Mehdi Khalaji, Khamenei may alter his fatwa under critical circumstances, as did his predecessor, Ayatollah Khomeini, on some civil and political issues. According to Gareth Porter writing in Foreign Policy, Iran's aversion to nuclear and chemical weapons is sincere because of the "historical episode during its eight-year war with Iraq", and Iran never sought revenge for Iraqi chemical attacks against Iran, which killed 20,000 Iranians and severely injured 100,000 more. According to  Khalaji, the fatwa is also considered to be consistent with Islamic tradition.

The fatwa is included on Khamenei's official website, and it was referred to in remarks by both US President Barack Obama and Khamenei himself.
Minister of Intelligence has said this fatwa may be overturned in extreme condition.

Background
According to Gareth Porter, the fatwa was issued for the first time in the mid-1990s in a letter that was never publicly released. The fatwa was issued "without any fanfare" responding to a request from an official "for his religious opinion on nuclear weapons".

In October 2003, Khamenei issued an oral fatwa that forbade the production and using any form of weapon of mass destruction.
Two years later, in August 2005, the fatwa was cited in an official statement by the Iranian government at a meeting of the International Atomic Energy Agency (IAEA) in Vienna. It stated that the production, stockpiling and use of nuclear weapons were forbidden under Islam.

Iran's nuclear program has been a subject of international debate for decades. The Iranian government claims that the purpose of its nuclear development is to produce electricity, and Khamenei said that it fundamentally rejects nuclear weapons, but experts believe that Iran is technically able to enrich uranium for producing a bomb within a few months.

Four days after the Joint Comprehensive Plan of Action (JCPOA) agreement, Khamenei delivered a speech, highlighting his fatwa and rejecting the claim that the nuclear talks, rather than Iran's religious abstinence, prevented Iran from acquiring nuclear weapons:

Official statements
The Iranian official website for information on its nuclear program has provided numerous instances of public statements by Khamenei in which he voices his opposition to pursuit and development of nuclear weapons in moral, religious and Islamic juridical terms. Khamenei's official website specifically cites a 2010 version of those statements in the fatwa section of the website in Farsi as a fatwa on "Prohibition of Weapons of Mass Destruction":  Also, he said during a speech delivered on 9 April 2015 in a meeting with a group of panegyrists:

Reception
The fatwa has been widely discussed by international officials and was referred to in remarks by US President Barack Obama.

In a statement on a conversation with Hasan Rouhani, Obama said:  A similar statement is quoted from John Kerry, saying: 

The fatwa is regarded as consistent with a set of rules in Islamic tradition that prohibit weapons that indiscriminately kill women, children and the elderly.

Analysis
Questions have been raised by some experts thinktanks affiliated with the US and Israel on the fatwa's existence, authenticity and impact and on whether it was only a political statement that lacks the authority of a religiously-binding fatwa. James Risen of The New York Times noted that Khamenei said "that it was a mistake for Col. Muammar el-Qaddafi of Libya to give up his nuclear weapons program". Some analysts raised the possibility that Khamenei might be lying by using taqiyya, which is a form of religious dissembling. In 2015, an open letter to Obama, posted on Iranian.com, reportedly from a nephew of Ali Khamenei, stated that Khamenei practiced taqiyya with regard to the fatwa. Gholam-Hossein Elham, an Iranian politician, argues that "taqiya" does not apply here because the fatwa by Khamenei is a primary religious order, not a secondary one. According to him, Khamenei's fatwa bans massacre of innocent people; that is not going to change in any situation since it is a primary order. Also, he said that Islamic jurists have banned deception in jihad and war, which are Islamic leaders he respects. On November 1, 2015, The Jerusalem Post also noted that the fatwa came after President Akbar Hashemi Rafsanjani had admitted the nuclear option was explored and referred to it in an interview. However, according to the Iranian nuclear hope website, Rafsanjani's interview, when it was initially published, was "skewed by Zionist media," and Rafsanjani said that "there was no reason to go toward the military aspect of nuclear issues, we did not want to build nuclear weapons."

According to Abbas Milani, whether the fatwa "actually exists and even whether Mr. Khamenei is entitled to issue fatwas and finally how changeable are fatwas are all contested matters". While Seyyed Hossein Mousavian, head of the Iranian Foreign Relations Committee from 1997 to 2005 and a research scholar at Princeton University, recalls seeing the letter containing the anti-nuclear fatwa issued in the mid-1990s in office of the Iranian Supreme National Security Council, Karim Sadjadpour argues that the references to the fatwa by the US government may be done to give the Iranians a route to compromise on the basis of religious beliefs rather than pressure from US-led sanctions.

According to Khalaji, a senior fellow at the Washington Institute for Near East Policy, "fatwas are issued in response to specific circumstances and can be altered in response to changing conditions". He argued that Khomeini altered some of his former viewpoints on issues such as taxes, military conscription, women's suffrage and monarchy as a form of government and so Khamenei may likewise modify supplanting his nuclear fatwa under critical circumstances. Similarly, Michael Eisenstadt argued that Khamenei may have issued the fatwa to reduce the international pressure on Iran and that "no religious principle would prevent Khamenei from modifying or supplanting his initial fatwa if circumstances were to change" and "expediency/interest of the regime (maslahat) so required," 

Gareth Porter argues that "the analysis of Khamenei's fatwa has been flawed", not only because the role of the "guardian jurist" in the Iranian political-legal system is not totally understood but also because the history of the fatwa is ignored. He also believes that to understand Iranian policy toward nuclear weapons, one should refer to the "historical episode during its eight-year war with Iraq", which explains why Iran never used chemical weapons against Iraq seeking revenge for Iraqis attacks killing 20,000 Iranians and severely injured 100,000 more. Porter argues that fact to suggest strongly that Iran has sincerely made a "deep-rooted" ban on developing chemical and nuclear weapons. In an interview with Porter, Mohsen Rafighdoost, the eight-year wartime minister of the Islamic Revolutionary Guard Corps, disclosed how Khomeini had opposed his proposal for beginning working on both nuclear and chemical weapons by a fatwa. The details on when and how it was issued had never been made public.

Former Iranian MP Ali Motahari said the fatwa only forbids the use of a nuclear weapon, not its creation.

See also

 Anti-nuclear movement in the United States
 History of nuclear weapons
 Ja'fari jurisprudence
 List of fatwas
 Nuclear weapons and the United States
 Marja' Taqlid
 Second Phase of the Revolution
 (Seyyed Ali Khamenei's letter) "To the Youth in Western Countries"

References

Fatwas
2003 in Iran
2005 in Iran
2005 documents
Islamic jurisprudence
Politics of Iran
Nuclear energy in Iran
Nuclear program of Iran
Ali Khamenei